Dashrath Patel (1927 – 1 December 2010) was an Indian designer, sculptor, who was the founder secretary of the National Institute of Design (NID), Ahmedabad, from 1961 to 1981.

He was awarded the Padma Shri by Government of India in 1981, followed by the Padma Bhushan, posthumously in 2011.

Early life and education
Born in 1927 in Sojitra, Gujarat, Patel studied fine arts at Government College of Fine Arts, Chennai (1949–53), where Debi Prasad Roy Choudhury was his mentor; thereafter studied painting, sculpture and ceramics during his Post Graduate studies at École des Beaux-Arts, Paris (1953–1955).

Career
He practiced in diverse art fields as a painter, ceramist, a graphic designer, industrial design and exhibition design. Early in his career he was contemporary of Tyeb Mehta, M.F. Hussain and V. S. Gaitonde who were together in the 1950s in Bhulabhai Desai Institute, Mumbai, and often exhibited alongside them. Later Henri Cartier-Bresson introduced him to photography, after former visited his exhibition at the Galerie Barbizon, Paris. He remained the secretary of the National Institute of Design, Ahmedabad for its first 20 years, from 1961, he also established the ceramics department at the institute. He resigned from NID in 1981 disillusioned, and went on to establish the Rural Design School in Sewapuri, near Varanasi.

He has collaborated creatives like Charles Eames, Louis I. Kahn, Frei Otto, Harindranath Chattopadhyay, dancer Chandralekha.
He died in Ahmedabad after a brief illness, at the age of 83 on 1 December 2010.

During the last decade of his life, he worked largely from Alibag, near Mumbai, where the Dashrath Patel Museum now houses his multidisciplinary oeuvre.

See also 

 Chandralekha (dancer)
 National Institute of Design, Ahmedabad

References

External links
"Dashrath Patel Profile,Interview and Artworks"
Dashrath Patel Museum, website
Works by Dashrath Patel
National Institute of Design

20th-century Indian designers
1927 births
2010 deaths
Artists from Ahmedabad
Gujarati people
Indian male sculptors
Indian ceramists
Indian graphic designers
Recipients of the Padma Shri in arts
Recipients of the Padma Bhushan in arts
École des Beaux-Arts alumni
Government College of Fine Arts, Chennai alumni
20th-century Indian sculptors
20th-century Indian male artists
Academic staff of National Institute of Design
Designers at National Institute of Design
Experiments in Art and Technology collaborating artists